Jeremiah Morrow (October 6, 1771March 22, 1852) was a Democratic-Republican Party politician from Ohio. He served as the ninth governor of Ohio, and was the last Democratic-Republican to hold that office. He also served as a United States Senator and a member of the United States House of Representatives from Ohio. He also served in the Ohio Senate.

Biography
Morrow was born near Gettysburg in the Province of Pennsylvania. He was of Scots-Irish descent, his Irish grandfather, also Jeremiah Morrow, had come to America from County Londonderry, and was descended from 17th century Scottish settlers. He moved to the Northwest Territory in 1795. He lived at the mouth of the Little Miami River for a short time before moving to what is now Warren County.  As a member of the Associate Reformed Presbyterian Church, he sought the services of a minister of his denomination soon after settling in the region, and he was one of the original elders of the Mill Creek congregation when it was organized shortly before 1800.

After serving in the Territorial House of Representatives and Territorial Senate, and as a Hamilton county delegate to the 1802 Constitutional Convention, he was elected to the first State Senate a year later and served six months before becoming Ohio's first member of the United States House of Representatives. Morrow won four additional full terms. He ran for the U.S. Senate in 1812 and served a single term from 1813 to 1819, and did not seek re-election.  As such, he was the first U.S. Senator for Ohio to serve a full six-year term. Morrow was elected a member of the American Antiquarian Society in 1814. In 1820, he served as one of Ohio's Presidential electors for James Monroe. He won election to the governorship in 1822 and served for two two-year terms. He declined to serve a third term, instead returning to the Ohio House of Representatives and State Senate. Morrow was sent back to Washington again in 1841, and served two more years in the House, but refused to be renominated in 1842, believing himself too old.

Death and legacy
After retiring from politics, Morrow returned to his farm and gristmill in Warren County. He died in 1852.

Morrow is the namesake of the Jeremiah Morrow Bridge, the highest bridge in Ohio. Morrow County and Morrow, Ohio are named after him. His grandson, George E. Morrow, was a professor at the University of Illinois and Iowa State University, and was president of Oklahoma State University.

References

External links

1771 births
1852 deaths
People from Gettysburg, Pennsylvania
American people of Scotch-Irish descent
Associate Reformed Presbyterian Church
Democratic-Republican Party members of the United States House of Representatives from Ohio
Democratic-Republican Party United States senators from Ohio
Whig Party members of the United States House of Representatives from Ohio
1820 United States presidential electors
Northwest Territory officials
Northwest Territory House of Representatives
Governors of Ohio
Democratic-Republican Party state governors of the United States
Members of the Ohio House of Representatives
Ohio state senators
Ohio Constitutional Convention (1802)
People from Warren County, Ohio
People from Hamilton County, Ohio
Members of the American Antiquarian Society
19th-century American politicians